Leonín Pineda Velázquez (born 30 November 1985) is a Mexican former footballer who played as a goalkeeper.

Leonín Pineda was the goalie that helped Club Tijuana reach the promotion to the Liga MX back in 2011 when they defeated Irapuato 2–1 on May 21, 2011.

External links
 
 
 

1985 births
Living people
Club América footballers
Club Tijuana footballers
Footballers from Guerrero
Mexican footballers
Association football goalkeepers